Dean Delany (born 15 September 1980) is an Irish former footballer who played as a goalkeeper.

Beginning his career in England with Everton in 1997, three years later he moved on to Port Vale, having never turned out for the first team at Everton despite winning caps for the Republic of Ireland under-21s and lifting the FA Youth Cup. He spent four years with Vale, and did make 39 first team appearances, though was never their first choice keeper. He also spent time on loan at Macclesfield Town, but never made it onto the field. He returned to Ireland in 2004 to sign a contract with Shelbourne, who he helped to the League of Ireland title in 2006. He spent 2007 with Waterford United, though returned to Shelbourne the following year. The "Shels" had been demoted in his absence, and he was the goalkeeper in the 2011 season, as they won promotion back into the top-flight. He joined Bohemians in time for the 2013 season, before returning to Shelbourne again in 2017 and helping the club to win promotion as League of Ireland First Division champions in 2019. He was named on the PFAI First Division Team of the Year for the 2009 and 2018 seasons.

Club career

Everton
After securing a contract with English Premier League side Everton as a teenager in 1997, his first year saw him winning the FA Youth Cup. Delany only made one appearance for the "Toffees", and was unable to break into the first team. In the summer of 2000 he moved to the Second Division side Port Vale.

Port Vale
During his four seasons with Port Vale he made 39 appearances in all competitions and was an unused substitute in the 2001 League Trophy final against Brentford at the Millennium Stadium. He also won the Staffordshire Senior Cup in 2001. He also had a two-month stint on loan to Macclesfield Town. Delany failed to gain an appearance with Macclesfield during his time at Moss Rose. He fell down to third in the pecking order at Vale Park behind Mark Goodlad and Jonny Brain, and was released by manager Martin Foyle in May 2004.

Shelbourne
Deciding to return home to Ireland's League of Ireland, Delany joined Shelbourne to play first-team football. He joined the club in May 2004 on a short-term contract until the close of the 2004 season, and secured a two-year deal after the club won the league title that year. He eventually made his "Shels" league debut during a 4–2 victory against Waterford United at the RSC on 24 June 2005 and earned himself a first team place. Delany won his second league winners medal with Shelbourne at the end of the 2006 season. He also represented Shelbourne in their successful years in the Champions League and UEFA Cup. Despite this success, he became a free agent as his contract at Shelbourne was not renewed due to the club's troubled financial situation.

Waterford
Prior to the 2007 season, Derry City offered Delany a trial. However, he did not join his former Shelbourne boss Pat Fenlon due to failed negotiations, and joined Waterford United on 15 March 2007 on a free transfer and quickly became the "Blues" first choice keeper. Despite Delany's heroics throughout the season, Waterford were relegated to the First Division at the end of the season, losing to Finn Harps in a two-legged promotion/relegation play-off. Delany won Waterford's overall Player of the Year award, and helped the "Blues" to win the Munster Senior Cup, but he departed Waterford at the end of the season to rejoin former club Shelbourne.

Return to Shelbourne
On 7 March 2008, Delany played his first match for Shelbourne since 2006 in a 0–0 draw against Dundalk. He played in all 36 of Shelbourne's league matches in his first season back with the club and helped the "Reds" concede the fewest goals in the First Division, just 25 securing his position in division 1 team of the year. Shelbourne were narrowly denied promotion after a goal in the last minute of added-time in the final league game against Limerick gave Dundalk the First Division Championship and the accompanying promotion to the Premier Division.

Delany was yet again Shelbourne's first choice goalkeeper in 2009, playing in all but one league match and winning a place on the PFAI First Division Team of the Year. The "Shels" finished runners-up in the league and qualified for a promotion play-off with Sporting Fingal, which Fingal won 2–1, a slight consolation for him that year was that he was again voted in division 1 team of the year. The following season Delany fended off competition from Steve Williams, and kept goal as the club won the 2010 Leinster Senior Cup; he kept a clean sheet in the final against Bray Wanderers. He retained his first team place in 2011 ahead of new signing Paul Skinner, as the "Reds" won promotion as First Division runners-up; the league was extremely tight, as just three points separated the top four teams. He also played in the FAI Cup final at the Aviva Stadium, where his side lost out to Sligo Rovers in the penalty shoot-out following a 1–1 draw.

Bohemians
On 20 December 2012, Delany was one of 20 players to sign up with Aaron Callaghan's Bohemian for the 2013 campaign. Dean was ever present during "Bohs" league campaign, featuring in all 33 games and he signed a new one-year contract at the close of that season to keep him at the club until the end of 2014. Bohemian finished fifth in 2015, an improvement of two places on the 2014 campaign. They finished eighth in the 2016 campaign.

Third spell at Shelbourne
Delany joined Shelbourne for a third spell for the 2017 season. He made 27 appearances as Owen Heary's Shelbourne posted a fourth-place finish and won his third Leinster Senior Cup as Shelbourne beat Dundalk 4–2 after extra-time at Oriel Park. He was named on the PFAI First Division Team of the Year for the 2018 season, having made 28 league appearances throughout the year. Shelbourne qualified for the play-offs, losing out Drogheda United on penalties at the semi-final stage. He left Shelbourne after their First Division title winning 2019 season.

International career
Delany was capped at U15, 16, 18, 19, 20, 21 and B international level, and represented the Irish under-21s as a 17-year-old in a triangular Celtic tournament involving Scotland and Northern Ireland. He looked to be Ireland's most promising young goalkeeper after the 1999 World Youth Championship, in which he was part of the "Golden generation" of Irish youth football (which included talent such as Damien Duff, Richard Dunne and Robbie Keane), a side that eventually made it to the quarter finals of the competition. He was also part of the Irish UEFA Under-18 Championship winning squad of 1998, the following year he was eligible again and played a big part in securing a bronze medal in the third-place play-off in Sweden. He made 28 appearances for the Republic of Ireland youth teams, including an impressive 21 appearances for the Irish under 21s under bosses Ian Evans and Don Givens.

He later was noticed after making a start to the 2003–04 season with Port Vale by the then Republic of Ireland manager Brian Kerr who called him into the senior international squad for a training camp before the crucial European championship qualifier against Georgia.

Personal life
Delany is married with three children. He holds a keen interest in music, and was rhythm guitarist and vocalist of Irish indie band The Novas. Delany has worked as a postal worker with An Post since returning to semi-professional football in Ireland.

Career statistics

Competitions include UEFA Champions League and UEFA Intertoto Cup
Competitions include League Trophy, Setanta Sports Cup, Leinster Senior Cup and League of Ireland Promotion/relegation play-offs

Honours
Individual
 PFAI First Division Team of the Year: 2009, 2018

Everton
 FA Youth Cup: 1998

Port Vale
 Football League Trophy: 2001

Shelbourne
 League of Ireland: 2004, 2006
 Leinster Senior Cup: 2010, 2017
 League of Ireland First Division promotion: 2011
 League of Ireland First Division: 2019

Waterford United
 Munster Senior Cup: 2007

Bohemians
 Leinster Senior Cup: 2016

Republic of Ireland
 UEFA European Under-19 Championship: 1998

References

1980 births
Living people
Association footballers from Dublin (city)
Association football goalkeepers
Republic of Ireland association footballers
Republic of Ireland youth international footballers
Republic of Ireland under-21 international footballers
Republic of Ireland expatriate association footballers
Cherry Orchard F.C. players
Everton F.C. players
Port Vale F.C. players
Macclesfield Town F.C. players
Shelbourne F.C. players
Waterford F.C. players
Bohemian F.C. players
English Football League players
League of Ireland players